Any Old Arms Won't Do is a compilation studio album by country singer Willie Nelson.

Track listing 
"I Let My Mind Wander"
"December Days"
"I Can't Find the Time"
"I Don't Sleep a Wink"
"You Wouldn't Cross the Street to Say Goodbye"
"Suffering in Silence"
"I Feel Sorry for Him"
"You'll Always Have Someone"
"I Just Don't Understand"
"Shelter of My Arms"
"Any Old Arms Won't Do" (Hank Cochran, Willie Nelson)
"Slow Down Old World"
"Healing Hands of Time"
"And So Will You My Love"
"Things to Remember"
"One Step Beyond"
"Undo the Wrong"
"Home Is Where You're Happy"
"Why Are You Picking on Me?"
"Blame It on the Time"

1992 compilation albums
Willie Nelson compilation albums